Index of Wikipedia articles about individual prostitutes.

A

 Sada Abe
 Patoo Abraham
 Elizabeth Adams (madam)
 Saint Afra
 Air Force Amy
 Josephine Airey
 Brenda Allen
 Norma Jean Almodovar
 Anita Alvarado
 Lily Argent
 Josie Arlington
 Nina Arsenault
 Mickey Avalon

B

 Wendy Babcock
 Dorothy Baker (madam)
 Revelle Balmain
 Trisha Baptie
 Candy Barr
 Fernande Barrey
 Jeanne de Bellem
 Richard Berkowitz
 Diamond Bessie
 Big Nose Kate
 Valtesse de La Bigne
 Madeline Blair
 Mattie Blaylock
 Blonde Dolly
 Scotty Bowers
 Gary Ray Bowles
 Sarah A. Bowman
 Shirley Brifman
 Brandi Britton
 Carrie Brown
 Julia Brown
 Susannah Buckler
 Julia Bulette

C

 Nellie Cameron
 Eylül Cansın
 Betty Careless
 Caridad la Negra
 Hannah Chaplin
 Annie Chapman
 Deborah Churchill
 Sylvia Clevenger
 Monica Coghlan
 Elizabeth Cresswell
 Lisa Crystal Carver
 Andrew Cunanan
 Lizzie Cyr

D

 Kimberly Daniels
 Binodini Dasi
 Zahia Dehar
 Vanessa de Oliveira
 Honeysuckle Divine
 Issan Dorsey
 Phoebe Doty
 Dora DuFran
 Ashley Alexandra Dupré

E

 Catherine Eddowes
 Pearl Elliott
 Schwesta Ewa
 Els von Eystett

F

 Christiane F.
 Margaret Fernseed
 Robyn Few
 Alexis Fire
 Albert Fish
 Florrie Fisher
 Heidi Fleiss
 Ali Forney
 Priss Fotheringham
 Denham Fouts

G

 Ronnie Lee Gardner
 Elisabeth Gassner
 Jean Genet
 Geske
 Sakineh Ghasemi
 Jody Gibson
 Billi Gordon
 Raymond Gravel
 Mary Ann Greaves
 Klara Grön

H

 Kim Hak-sun
 Maggie Hall
 Lin Hei'er
 Fred Halsted
 Gerald Hannon
 Catherine Healy (activist)
 Toni Jo Henry
 Richard Holcomb
 Xaviera Hollander
 Amber L. Hollibaugh
 Jason Holliday
 Kim Hollingsworth
 John Holmes (actor)
 Sallie-Anne Huckstepp

J

 Calamity Jane
 Rebecca Jarrett
 Helen Jewett
 Dean Johnson (entertainer)
 Mollie Johnson
 Constantia Jones
 Mary Jones (trans woman)

K

 Hande Kader
 Kanhopatra
 Mary Jane Kelly
 Alika Kinan
 Moll King

L

 La Macorina
 Robert La Tourneaux
 Yvette Laclé
 Caroline Lacroix
 Vicky de Lambray
 Laura Lee (sex worker)
 Carol Leigh
 Kitty Leroy
 Maxi Linder
 Alice Little
 Sally Lodge
 Beatriz Zamora López
 Crazy Lou
 Molly Luft
 Catherine Lynch
 Bente Lyon

M

 Brooke Magnanti
 Luka Magnotta
 Rosa May
 Maheeda
 Dulcie Markham
 Chicago May
 Jamila M'Barek
 Fillide Melandroni
 Morgane Merteuil
 Adeline Miller
 Della Moore
 Vicki Morgan
 Mother Featherlegs
 Marie Jonas de la Motte
 Gerda Munsinger
 Suzanne Muzard

N

 Tímea Nagy (activist)
 Lâm Uyển Nhi
 Mary Ann Nichols
 Domenica Niehoff
 Rosemarie Nitribitt

O

 Jean O'Hara

P

 Damaris Page
 Maria Pantazi
 Barbara Payton
 Louise Peete
 Bridget Perrier
 Kath Pettingill
 Willie Piazza
 Fannie Porter
 Zofia Potocka
 Anna Pulitzer

Q

 Tracy Quan

R

 Jurjentje Aukes Rauwerda
 Grisélidis Réal
 Mima Renard
 Elena Reynaga
 Marthe Richard
 Selina Rushbrook
 John/Eleanor Rykener

S

 Sally Salisbury
 Jacopo Saltarelli
 John Saul (prostitute)
 Shalimar Seiuli
 Aiden Shaw
 Ching Shih
 Mattie Silks
 Emma Elizabeth Smith
 Anna Smitshuizen
 Valerie Solanas
 Almeda Sperry
 Sharleen Spiteri (sex worker)
 Annie Sprinkle
 Nancy Spungen
 Lindi St Clair
 Margo St. James
 Pearl Starr
 David Henry Sterry
 Star Stowe
 Elizabeth Stride

T

 Martha Tabram
 Tulasa Thapa
 Nikki Thomas
 Sunset Thomas
 Estella Marie Thompson
 Libby Thompson
 Ah Toy
 Mary Ellen Tracy
 Tiger Tyson

V

 Carla van Raay
 María José la Valenciana
 Pearl de Vere
 Rétaux de Villette
 Sheila Vogel-Coupe

W

 Yamada Waka
 Rosemary West
 Sheila White (abolitionist)
 Zara Whites
 Anna Wilson (madam)
 Helen Wood (television personality)
 Louise Wooster
 Aileen Wuornos

X

 Venus Xtravaganza

Y

Z

 Du Zhu

Prostitutes
Lists of sex workers
Sexuality-related lists
Wikipedia indexes